Hüseyin Oruç is a Turkish badminton player. He won the silver medal at the 2013 Mediterranean Games in the men's doubles event partnered with Emre Aslan. In 2012, he and Aslan also won the men's doubles title at the Iraq International tournament.

Achievements

Mediterranean Games 
Men's doubles

BWF International Challenge/Series 
Men's doubles

  BWF International Challenge tournament
  BWF International Series tournament
  BWF Future Series tournament

References

External links 
 

Living people
Year of birth missing (living people)
Sportspeople from Bursa
Turkish male badminton players
Mediterranean Games silver medalists for Turkey
Competitors at the 2013 Mediterranean Games
Mediterranean Games medalists in badminton